Nantes Roller Derby is a women's flat track roller derby league based in Nantes in France. Founded in 2010, the league consists of three teams, and two mixed teams which compete against teams from other leagues. Nantes is a member of the Women's Flat Track Derby Association (WFTDA).

History
The league was founded in October 2010 by Katie Bourner, an English student, who later captained the A team as "Psychokat".  Within weeks, she and her friends had recruited thirty trainees, and by early 2012, the league had 65 skaters.

Nantes held its first public exhibition games in May 2011, mixed scrimmages with Rouen, Brest and Rennes, and by 2012 was regularly playing sell-out bouts.

In October 2013, Nantes were accepted as a member of the Women's Flat Track Derby Association Apprentice Programme. Nantes became a full member of the WFTDA in October 2014.

WFTDA rankings

References

Roller derby leagues in France
Roller derby leagues established in 2010
Sport in Nantes
Women's Flat Track Derby Association leagues
2010 establishments in France